The 2012 Big South Conference baseball tournament was held from May 22 through 26.  The top eight regular season finishers of the ten eligible teams met in the double-elimination tournament which was held at George S. Erath Field at Coy O. Williard Baseball Stadium on the campus of High Point University in High Point, NC.   was not eligible for postseason play in any sport until the 2012–2013 academic year due to its transition to Division I.  Top seeded  won their thirteenth championship and earned the conference's automatic bid to the 2012 NCAA Division I baseball tournament.

Seeding
The top eight finishers from the regular season will be seeded one through eight.

Results

All-Tournament Team
The following players were named to the All-Tournament Team.

Most Valuable Player
Aaron Burke and Ryan Connolly were named co-Most Valuable Players.  Burke and Connolly were both pitchers for Coastal Carolina.

References

Big South Conference Tournament
Big South Conference Baseball Tournament
Big South baseball tournament
Big South Conference baseball tournament